Asceua elegans is a species of spiders in the family Zodariidae. It is the type species of the genus. It is found in Myanmar.

References 

 Asceua elegans at the World Spider Catalog

Zodariidae
Spiders described in 1887